The following Union Army units and commanders fought in the Battle of Arkansas Post (1863) (otherwise known as Battle of Fort Hindman) of the American Civil War. The Confederate order of battle is listed separately. Order of battle compiled from the army organization and return of casualties during the battle.

Abbreviations used

Military rank
 MG = Major General
 BG = Brigadier General
 Col = Colonel
 Ltc = Lieutenant Colonel
 Maj = Major
 Cpt = Captain
 Lt = 1st Lieutenant

Other
 w = wounded

Army of the Mississippi

MG John A. McClernand

XIII Corps

BG George W. Morgan
Chief of Staff: Maj John H. Hammond
Escort: Company A, 3rd Illinois Cavalry: Cpt Richard H. Ballinger

XV Corps

MG William T. Sherman

Naval forces
Rear Admiral David D. Porter

Fifty transport ships were used as well as the following:

See also

 Arkansas in the American Civil War
 McClernand's Official Report

Notes

References
U.S. War Department, The War of the Rebellion: a Compilation of the Official Records of the Union and Confederate Armies, U.S. Government Printing Office, 1880–1901.
 Johnson, Robert Underswood & Clarence Clough Buell (eds.).  Battles and Leaders of the Civil War (New York:  The Century Company), 1884.

American Civil War orders of battle